Northwestern Senior High School is the westernmost active high school in Erie County, Pennsylvania.

Its student body is approximately 451. The school serves the boroughs of Albion, Platea, Cranesville, Springfield Township, Conneaut Township, and Elk Creek Township.

Notable alumni are John Williams, a 1972 Olympics gold medal winner archery champion, who was born in Albion's neighboring village, Cranesville; and David Lohr, a 1992 graduate who is a well-known crime journalist for Discovery Communications, truTV and AOL.

References

External links
 Northwestern Senior High School's official website

Public high schools in Pennsylvania
Schools in Erie County, Pennsylvania